Featuring Master P is a 2007 compilation album by Master P. It was released on 14 August 2007 and contains many songs that he was featured on during his time on No Limit Records.

Track listing

References

2007 compilation albums
Master P albums
Gangsta rap compilation albums